Bruin, Bruijn, Bruyn and Bruins are Dutch surnames. They can be equivalent to the English surname Brown or, particularly for the form "Bruins", be patronymic as Bruin/Bruijn is a now rare Dutch form of Bruno. The form "the brown" (De Bruin, De Bruine, De Bruijn, De Bruyn and De Bruyne) is more common.

Notable people with the surname include:

Bruin
James J. Bruin (1898–1949), Massachusetts politician
Jan Bruin (born 1969), Dutch footballer
Joseph Bruin (1809–1882), American slave trader
Will Bruin (born 1989), American soccer player
Bruijn
Antonie Augustus Bruijn (1842–1890), Dutch navy officer, merchant and naturalist
 Named after him: Bruijn's brushturkey and Bruijn's Riflebird
Jaap R. Bruijn (born 1938), Dutch maritime historian
Jordy Bruijn (born 1996), Dutch football midfielder
Bruyn
Andrew DeWitt Bruyn (1790–1838), New York politician
Barthel Bruyn the Elder (1493–1555), Cologne Renaissance painter 
Barthel Bruyn the Younger (c.1530–c.1608), Cologne Renaissance painter 
Jan Bruyn (born 1948), Dutch rower
Maurice Bruyn (1386–1466), English knight (name derived from "Brun")
Bruins
Bruno Bruins (born 1963), Dutch politician
Eppo Bruins (born 1969), Dutch politician
Hanke Bruins Slot (born 1977), Dutch politician
Jan Bruins (1940–1997), Dutch motorcycle road racer
Luigi Bruins (born 1987), Dutch footballer
Mary Bruins Allison (1903–1994), American doctor and missionary
Récardo Bruins Choi (born 1985), Dutch-Korean racecar driver
Regina Bruins (born 1986), Dutch racing cyclist
Rika Bruins (born 1934), Dutch swimmer
Siert Bruins (1921–2015), Dutch collaborator with Nazi Germany
Theo Bruins (1929–1993), Dutch pianist and composer
Tonny Bruins Slot (1947–2020), Dutch football coach
Bruyns
Mark Bruyns (born 1973), South African cricketer

See also
Joe Bruin, mascot of the University of California, Los Angeles sports teams

References

Dutch-language surnames
Surnames from nicknames